This is a list of airports in Suriname, sorted by location.

Suriname, officially the Republic of Suriname, is a country in northern South America. It is situated between French Guiana to the east and Guyana to the west. The southern border is shared with Brazil and the northern border is the Atlantic coast. Suriname is the smallest sovereign state in terms of area and population in South America. The country is the only Dutch-speaking region in the Western Hemisphere that is not a part of the Kingdom of the Netherlands.



Airports 

Airport names shown in bold indicate the airport has scheduled service on commercial airlines.

Airports with unverified coordinates:

Map

See also 
 Transport in Suriname
 Operation Grasshopper
 List of airports by ICAO code: S#SM - Suriname
 Wikipedia: WikiProject Aviation/Airline destination lists: South America#Suriname

References 
 Civil Aviation Department of Suriname
 
  - includes IATA codes
 World Aero Data: Airports in Suriname - ICAO codes, airport data
 Great Circle Mapper: Airports in Suriname - IATA and ICAO codes
 GEOnet Names Server - district names
 Large map of Suriname
 Airstrip characteristics Flood relief map

Suriname
 
Airports
Suriname
Airports